Thomas Low may refer to:

 Tommy Low (1874–?), Scottish footballer
 Thomas Andrew Low (1871–1931), Canadian industrialist and politician